Maningrida arnhemensis is a species of small, air-breathing land snail with an operculum, a pulmonate gastropod mollusc in the superfamily Amphiboloidea.

Maningrida arnhemensis is the only species in the genus Maningrida, that is the only genus within the family Maningrididae.

Distribution 
Australia.

References

Maningrididae
Gastropods described in 2007